Stephen Sondheim (19302021) was an American composer and lyricist known for his work in musical theatre and film.  Sondheim received a Presidential Medal of Freedom (2015) and the Kennedy Center Honors (1993) for an outstanding career of excellence. His accolades include a Pulitzer Prize (1985), eight Tony Awards, including a 2008 Lifetime Achievement award for his work on Broadway, an Academy Award, eight Grammy Awards, fifteen Drama Desk Awards, five Laurence Olivier Awards, including a 2011 Olivier Special Award. Theaters named in his honor stand on Broadway since 2010 and London's West End since 2019.

Major awards

Academy Awards

Golden Globe Awards

Grammy Awards

Laurence Olivier Awards

Tony Awards

Miscellaneous awards

Drama Desk Awards

Edgar Awards

IFMCA Awards

Obie Awards

OFTA Awards
Online Film & Television Association Awards

St. Louis Gateway Film Critics Awards

Special honors

American Theater Hall of Fame

Kennedy Center Honors

Pulitzer Prize

Presidential Medal of Freedom

Songwriters Hall of Fame

Edward MacDowell Medal

See also
 List of EGOT winners

Notes

References

Awards
Lists of awards received by American musician